Spirits of Death (/ translation: A White Dress for Mariale) is a 1972 Italian film directed by Romano Scavolini and starring Ida Galli, Ivan Rassimov and Luigi Pistilli. The film was also released as Exorcisme Tragique (Tragic Exorcism).

Plot
As a child, Mariale witnesses the murder of her mother at her father's hands. She later becomes a recluse, living by herself in a dark, gloomy castle. Mariale decides to invite some friends over for the weekend and stages a decadent orgiastic party. Then a series of grisly murders begin to occur.

Cast 
 Ida Galli as  Marialè
 Ivan Rassimov as  Massimo
 Shawn Robinson as Semy
 Luigi Pistilli as  Paolo
 Pilar Velázquez as  Mercedes
 Carla Mancini 
 Ezio Marano as  Sebastiano
 Gianni Dei as the lover of Marialè's mother

Style
Although the film is often described as a giallo, film historian Roberto Curti stated it only becomes a violent murder mystery about an hour into the film. Curti described the giallo trademarks of violent murders and a twist ending are marginal when compared to other films of the genre at the time. Curti opined the film was one like a perverse kammerspiel which borrowed from both gothic and avant-garde theatre.

Production
Following his return from Vietnam where he was a freelance photographer, director Romano Scavolini returned to his native Italy where he started his film career again as a genre filmmaker.

Release
Spirits of Death was released in Italy on 30 November 1972. The film grossed 65.564 million Italian lire in Italy on its release. When the film was released in France, it was titled Exorcisme tragique to try and bank on the popular success of The Exorcist.

Reception
In a retrospective review, Curti stated that Scavolini's direction and Fiorenzo Carpi's score "cannot overcome the script's many shortcoming–namely, sketchily developed characters, pretentious dialogue, heavy-handed symbolism." Scavolini later referred to the film as a film "which only deserves to be forgotten"

See also
 List of Italian films of 1972

References

Footnotes

Sources

External links

1972 films
Italian horror films
Films scored by Fiorenzo Carpi
Films set in castles
1970s Italian films